Alessia Gennari (born 3 November 1991) is an Italian volleyball player, who plays as an outside hitter for the Italian club Unet E-Work Busto Arsizio and the Italian women's national volleyball team. At club level, she has won the Italian Championship, Italian Cup and CEV Cup with the clubs she played for. With the national team, she won the gold medal at the 2013 Mediterranean Games and competed in the women's tournament at the 2016 Summer Olympics.

Awards

Individuals
 2007 Junior European Championships "Best Hitter"

Clubs
 2015–16 Lega Pallovolo Serie A Femminile -  Champion, with Pomi Casalmaggiore
 2016 Coppa Italia -  Champion, with Foppapedretti Bergamo
 2018–19 CEV Cup -  Champion, with Unet E-Work Busto Arsizio

National team

Junior team
 2007 Junior European Championship -  Bronze Medal

Senior team
 2013 Mediterranean Games -  Gold Medal

References

External links
 

1991 births
Living people
Italian women's volleyball players
Olympic volleyball players of Italy
Volleyball players at the 2016 Summer Olympics
Sportspeople from Parma
Mediterranean Games gold medalists for Italy
Mediterranean Games medalists in volleyball
Competitors at the 2013 Mediterranean Games
21st-century Italian women